"Not About Angels" is a song by English musician Birdy. It is one of the theme songs for the film adaptation of the book The Fault in Our Stars.

Music video
The music video for the song premiered on YouTube on 12 June 2014.

Charts

Weekly charts

Year-end charts

Certifications

References

Birdy (singer) songs
2014 songs
The Fault in Our Stars (film)
Atlantic Records singles